Avtar Singh Makkar (1943–2019) was a Punjabi politician and former President of Shiromani Gurdwara Parbandhak Committee.

Life and career
After the Partition of India he with his family first settled at Mustafabad then in Roorkee and finally in Jagraon, Ludhiana District. He did Faculty of Science from Gujranwala Guru Nanak Khalsa College and then served in Life Insurance Corporation of India.

Then he served in Shiromani Gurdwara Parbandhak Committee and in 2005 become President of SGPC till 2016. Since 2011, he served till 2016 due to the order of Supreme Court of India.

On 21 December 2019 he died due to long illness at a private hospital in Gurugram.

References

2019 deaths
1943 births
People from Sargodha
Shiromani Akali Dal politicians